Elektroni (trans. The Electrons) were a Yugoslav rock band formed in Karlovac in 1961. The band is notable as one of the pioneers of the Yugoslav rock scene.

History

1963–1969
Elektroni were formed at the end of 1961 in Karlovac by teenagers Jurica Grosinger (guitar), Ivica Bičanić (bass guitar), Branko Spudić (drums), Miro  Stern (rhythm guitar), Marijan Klobučar (keyboards) and Božidar Božek (tenor saxophone). The band had their first public performance in 1964 in their hometown, on the Mikrofon je vaš (The Microphone Is Yours) competition. Initially they performed The Shadows-influenced instrumentals, and later started performing covers of foreign rock hits, but also covers of traditional songs and their own material. The band held numerous performances on the island of Rab. In 1966 the band performed on the Zagreb Music Festival, winning the Zagreb City Silver Plaque. In May 1966 they opened the First Festival of Vocal-Instrumental Ensembles in Zagreb with an instrumental cover of the March on the Drina. In 1967 the band performed on the Second Festival of Vocal-Instrumental Ensembles. By then the band's drummer was Ivica Čadež. For a certain period of time, keyboardist Marijan Banić, vocalist Mirko Novosel and vocalist Silvio Vedrina performed with the band, all of them leaving Elektroni after a short period of time.

In 1967, Čadež, Bićanić and Stern left the group, and were replaced by Marjan Janjac (drums), Vatroslav Slavnić (bass guitar) and Boris Borošić (rhythm guitar). The new lineup of the band turned towards pop rock sound and performing their own songs. In 1968 the band released their only EP, Jedne noći (On One Night), through Jugoton record label. Beside the title track, the EP featured the songs "Drugog voliš" ("You Love Someone Else"), "Srna" ("Roe Deer") and "Sjećanje" ("Memory"). All the songs were composed by Slavnić, and the lyrics were written by young poet Velimir Franić.

The band's last lineup featured Jurica Grosinger (guitar), Vatroslav Slavnić (bass guitar), Darko Domijan (vocals, bass guitar, trombone), Velimir Cvijanović (drums), Boris Licitar (organ) and Ratko Pogačić (saxophone). The band ended their activity in 1970.

Post breakup
After Elektroni disbanded, Domijan started a successful career of a pop singer. For a period of time, his backing band Peta Rijeka (Fifth River) featured Licitar on keyboards.

In 2005 the song "Srna" and previously unreleased recordings "Moovin' and Groovin'" and "Začarano more" (a cover of The Islanders song "The Enchanted Sea") were published on the box set Kad je rock bio mlad - Priče sa istočne strane (1956-1970) (When Rock Was Young - East Side Stories (1956-1970)), released by Croatia Records in 2005 and featuring songs by the pioneering Yugoslav rock acts.

Discography

EPs
Jedne noći (1968)

Other appearances
"Srna" / "Moovin' and Groovin'" / "Začarano more" (Kad je rock bio mlad - Priče sa istočne strane (1956-1970), 2005)

References

External links 
Elektroni at Discogs

Croatian rock music groups
Yugoslav rock music groups
Yugoslav rhythm and blues musical groups
Instrumental rock musical groups
Beat groups
Musical groups established in 1961
Musical groups disestablished in 1970